Kevin Ondier Omondi (born 4 August 1990) is a Kenyan footballer who plays as a midfielder for Gor Mahia in the Kenyan Premier League.

International career

International goals
Scores and results list Kenya's goal tally first.

References

External links
 

1990 births
Living people
Gor Mahia F.C. players
Kenyan footballers
Kenya international footballers
Association football midfielders